Léonce Gaston Quentin (16 February 1880 – 1 December 1957) was a French archer who competed in the 1920 Summer Olympics. In 1920 he won four Olympic medals, one silver in the individual moving bird 28 metres event and two silver and one bronze in team competitions.

References

External links
 Léonce Quentin's profile at Sports Reference.com

1880 births
1957 deaths
French male archers
Olympic archers of France
Archers at the 1920 Summer Olympics
Olympic silver medalists for France
Olympic bronze medalists for France
Olympic medalists in archery
Medalists at the 1920 Summer Olympics
20th-century French people